is an original Japanese anime television series co-animated by Studio Gokumi and AXsiZ. The series aired from October to December 2020, while a manga adaptation by Hato Kannazuki was serialized from July 2020 to May 2021 in Monthly Comic Alive.

Characters

Owarai geinin

BAN BAN BAN

Other characters

Media

Light novel
A light novel written by Touko Machida and illustrated by Kagami Yoshimizu was released on December 10, 2020 entitled  by Kadokawa Shoten.

Manga
A manga adaptation illustrated by Hato Kannazuki launched in Media Factory's Monthly Comic Alive on July 27, 2020, and it ended on May 27, 2021. Two tankōbon volumes were released between November 21, 2020 and June 23, 2021.

Anime
On July 10, 2019, Kadokawa announced that an original anime television series involving scriptwriter Shōta Gotō and Kagami Yoshimizu, the author of Lucky Star, was in production. The series is animated by Studio Gokumi and AXsiZ, with Yuu Nobuta as director. Touko Machida, Shōta Gotō and Joe Itou are writing the scripts, Katsuzo Hirata is designing the characters, and Satoru Kōsaki, Oliver Good and Keita Inoue are composing the series' music. The series was originally scheduled to premiere in July 2020, but was delayed to October 2020 due to the COVID-19 pandemic. The series aired from October 11 to December 27, 2020. Act 0 of the series premiered on October 4, 2020. Funimation acquired the series and is streaming it on its website in North America and the British Isles, and on AnimeLab in Australia and New Zealand. The series ran for 12 episodes.

Notes

References

External links
Anime official website 

2020 Japanese novels
2020 anime television series debuts
Anime postponed due to the COVID-19 pandemic
Anime with original screenplays
AT-X (TV network) original programming
AXsiZ
Funimation
Media Factory manga
Seinen manga
Studio Gokumi